Michael Lyster (born 11 April 1954) is an Irish radio and television broadcaster who works for RTÉ. He mainly covers sporting events, such as Gaelic games and Olympic Games. He is best known for presenting The Sunday Game Live, which he hosted from 1984 to 2018.

Early life
The son of a member of the Garda Síochána, Lyster was born in Dungarvan, County Waterford. When he was four years-old his father was transferred to Barnaderg, County Galway, where Lyster spent his formative years. He was educated at St Jarlath's College in nearby Tuam. After leaving school, he started working in the lab of the local sugar factory.

Career

Journalism
Lyster began his journalistic career as a junior reporter with The Tuam Herald where he wrote a music column. He spent seven years with that newspaper before moving to television and radio.

Television and radio

In 1980, Lyster joined RTÉ as a sports bulletin broadcaster with Radio 2, however, as his career progressed he began presenting programmes and covering high-profile sporting events. In his first year at the national broadcaster he also covered the Olympic Games on radio. One of the highlights of his early career was covering the 1982 and 1983 All-Ireland hurling finals for radio. In 1984 Lyster took over as presenter of The Sunday Game, a post he held for 34 years. That same year he was one of the main presenters for RTÉ's television coverage of the Summer Olympics in Los Angeles, co-hosting the morning slot with Moya Doherty. It was RTÉ's first venture into breakfast television with the slot combining action from the Games with cookery and dance classes amongst other things.

In 1988, Lyster won a Jacob's Award for his work on The Sunday Game. Since then Lyster has covered a number of sports for RTÉ across all codes and has been an ever-present feature on RTÉ's coverage of Olympic Games. He remains, however, mostly associated with Gaelic games and has been one of the main presenters of the All-Star and the RTÉ Sports Person of the Year awards shows.

In 2007, Lyster took part in Celebrity Jigs 'n' Reels. Famously, when a penalty was applied to Hannah Craig during the 2012 Summer Olympics, Carl Dunne, head of the Irish canoeing team, telephoned RTÉ's analyst to discuss the possibility of appealing the decision. The analyst took the telephone call live on television as a bemused Lyster watched on.

After suffering ill health, Lyster decided to retire from The Sunday Game at the end of 2018, with the 2018 All-Ireland Senior Football Championship Final his last as presenter.

Personal life
Lyster has been married to his wife Anne since 1985 and together they have two boys and two girls. They live in Cabinteely in Dublin. Lyster has been interested in rally driving which he has enjoyed since the early 1990s. He has partook in many main events including the Cork International Rally where he finished third in 1992, the Circuit of Ireland Rally and the Killarney Rally of the Lakes. His co-driver is Irish Independent sports writer Vincent Hogan.

Health
On 5 June 2015 at 11:32pm Lyster had a major heart attack and was rushed to hospital. He had been playing golf in Galway with friend Vincent Hogan who drove him back to Dublin afterwards. He left his mobile phone in Vincent's car who he rang from his house phone asking him to return to the house with the mobile. Hogan returned to find him collapsed on the ground in the hallway. Lyster's wife Anne performed CPR while Vincent called for an ambulance. He had a pacemaker fitted after receiving treatment. Lyster later disclosed that he had suffered from a heart condition for a number of years prior to the attack.

References

1954 births
Living people
Gaelic games writers and broadcasters
Irish columnists
Irish sports broadcasters
Jacob's Award winners
People educated at St Jarlath's College
People from Dungarvan
Sportspeople from County Waterford
RTÉ television presenters
RTÉ 2fm presenters
The Tuam Herald people